Route 23 is a highway in central Missouri.  Its northern terminus is at U.S. Route 24 near Waverly; its southern terminus is at Route 2 west of Windsor.

Route description

History

Major intersections

References

023
Transportation in Henry County, Missouri
Transportation in Johnson County, Missouri
Transportation in Lafayette County, Missouri